First Wish is the first album by the trumpet player Chris Botti. It was released by Verve Forecast Records on February 28, 1995.

Track listing

Personnel
 Chris Botti – trumpet (1-10), keyboards (1-10), programming (1, 2, 3, 5, 6), tambourine (9), acoustic piano (10)
 Paul Joseph Moore – keyboards (1-10), acoustic piano (1), Omnichord (8)
 Andy Snitzer – Rhodes (1), programming (1, 5, 6)
 Mitchell Froom – Wurlitzer electric piano (5), organ (8)
 Kevin Killen – Omnichord (8)
 Larry Saltzman – guitars (1, 5, 7)
 Shane Fontayne – guitars (2, 6)
 Paul Livant – guitars (3)
 Marc Shulman – guitars (3, 4, 8, 9)
 Dominic Kanza – guitars (5)
 Pino Palladino – bass (1, 2, 4-9)
 Steve Ferrone – drums (1, 3, 5, 7, 8)
 Jerry Marotta – drums (2, 4, 6, 9) 
 Joe Bonadio – percussion (2, 3, 4, 7)
 Cyro Baptista – surdo (8), shaker (8)
 Michael Brecker – tenor saxophone (5)
 Sandra Park – violin (6)
 Rebecca Young – violin (6)
 Morris Goldberg – African flutes (7)
 Edie Brickell – vocals (4)

Production 
 Chris Botti – producer
 Kevin Killen – producer, engineer, mixing 
 Andy Snitzer – co-producer (1, 3, 5)
 Guy Eckstine – executive producer
 Andrew Page – additional recording 
 Marc Silag – production coordinator 
 David Lau – art direction 
 Sheryl Lutz-Brown – art direction
 Étsuko Iseki – design
 Gary St. Clair – design 
 Brad Hitz – photography

Charts

References

Chris Botti albums
1995 debut albums
Verve Forecast Records albums
Instrumental albums